The Antarctic Heritage Trust (New Zealand) was founded in 1987 and is the oldest member of the Antarctic Heritage Trust coalition.  The AHT-NZ is an independent charitable trust based in Christchurch, New Zealand.  It was created to care for sites important to the history of the Heroic Age of Antarctic Exploration located in the Ross Sea region of Antarctica.  

The sites that the AHT-NZ monitors include: four expedition bases associated with early Antarctic explorers, including those of Robert Falcon Scott, Ernest Shackleton and Carstens Borchgrevink. AHT-NZ patrons include the Governor General of New Zealand, and before his death Sir Edmund Hillary.  The Trust is governed by a board of trustees that represent a number of international agencies and organisations.  On an ongoing basis, work is carried out by two full-time staff members in Christchurch.

Projects
Currently the AHT-NZ is engaged in the "Ross Sea Heritage Restoration Project" which was launched by The Princess Royal in Antarctica in 2002.

Although receiving support from the UK Antarctic Heritage Trust, the AHT-NZ has assumed operational responsibility for the preservation of heritage sites in the Ross Sea region, including the above-mentioned huts.

In December 2013, the trust found 22 relatively intact negatives at the Scott site, left by the Shackleton expedition, some of which showed McMurdo Sound landmarks.

References

Further reading

External links
Antarctic Heritage Trust (New Zealand) web site

Ross Dependency
New Zealand and the Antarctic
1987 establishments in New Zealand
Organizations established in 1987